Müller's giant Sunda rat (Sundamys muelleri) is a species of rodent in the family Muridae.
It is found in Indonesia, Malaysia, Myanmar, the Philippines, and Thailand.

References

Sundamys
Rats of Asia
Rodents of Malaysia
Rodents of Indonesia
Rodents of Myanmar
Rodents of the Philippines
Rodents of Thailand
Mammals described in 1879
Taxonomy articles created by Polbot